Morris Loton (18 March 1905 – 2 March 1976) was an Australian cricketer. He played one first-class match for Western Australia in 1924/25.

See also
 List of Western Australia first-class cricketers

References

External links
 

1905 births
1976 deaths
Australian cricketers
Western Australia cricketers